Dan Smith (born February 23, 1989, in Manalapan Township, New Jersey) is an American professional poker player.  He now resides in Las Vegas, Nevada.  He has won many titles during his poker career, including a World Poker Tour title, a World Series of Poker bracelet and a championship event at the Aussie Millions.

Poker

Dan Smith started playing online poker at the age of 16, before actually reaching the legal gambling age in the US. He is a former chess player who got into college on a chess scholarship, but he decided to stop his studies in 2007 (at 18 years old) to pursue a full-time poker career.

His first cash and victory was in 2008 when he won the Heartland Poker Tour Main Event at Turning Stone Resort & Casino in New York for $101,960. Smith's biggest tournament cash to date came in June 2014 when he won the Bellagio Super High Roller $100,000 buy-in event with a grand prize of $2,044,766. He has over 74 cashes in live poker tournaments and has won over $36,000,000.

2012 was the turning point of Smith's career. He started the year by winning Aussie Millions 100k Challenge event for $1,012,000 AUD. He went on a tear in April at the EPT Monte Carlo Series. In a span of 5 days, he won 3 separate €5000  events for a combined €520,980.

In August of that year he captured the €962,925 first-place prize of the Season 9 EPT Barcelona €50,000 Super High Roller.

He has had multiple strong showings during the WSOP, in 2015 he finished 3rd in the $10,000 PLO for $369,564 and in 2014 he finished 20th in the $10,000 Main Event for $286,900. 
In 2012 he got 7th place in the Partouche Poker tour for €178,496 

All in all, he won six tournaments in 2012 and eventually won the 2012 GPI POY  and finished runner up in the cardplayer POY to Greg Merson  and also runner up in the Bluff Poy to Marvin Rettenmaier 

In December 2013, Dan took down the WPT Doyle Brunson Five Diamond World Poker Classic for $1,161,135.

In July 2016, he finished 2nd in WSOP  $111,111 No Limit Hold'em High Roller for One Drop for $3,078,974.

In September 2014 he was ranked 1st in the world by the Global poker index.
In September 2018 he placed 3rd in the WSOP $1 million Big One for One Drop event for $4,000,000.

In June, at the 2022 World Series of Poker, Smith captured his first bracelet. He defeated Christoph Vogelsang in the 25k Heads-UP Championship. Smith was considered to be the best player without a bracelet prior to the win.

As of August 2022, Smith's live tournament winnings exceed $38,992,280.

Charitable Activities

Smith has collaborated with The Life You Can Save, a non-profit founded by Peter Singer, to raise millions of dollars for highly effective charities via Smith's organization Double Up Drive.

References

1989 births
Living people
American poker players
World Poker Tour winners
People from Manalapan Township, New Jersey
People from Las Vegas